Dinan is a walled Breton town and a commune in the Côtes-d'Armor department in northwestern France. On 1 January 2018, the former commune of Léhon was merged into Dinan.

Geography

Its geographical setting is exceptional. Instead of nestling on the valley floor like Morlaix, most urban development has been on the hillside overlooking the river Rance. The area alongside the river is known as the "port of Dinan", and is connected to the town by steep streets: Rue Jerzual and its continuation outside the city walls, the Rue Petit Fort. The Rance has moderate turbidity and its brownish water is somewhat low in velocity due to the very low gradient of the watercourse; pH levels have been measured at a slightly basic 8.13 within the city, and electrical conductivity of the waters has tested at 33 micro-siemens per centimetre.

For many years, the bridge over the river Rance at Dinan was the most northerly crossing point on the river, but the tidal power station at the mouth of the estuary, constructed in the 1960s downstream from Dinan, incorporates a 750-metre long tidal barrage, which also serves as a crossing point nearer to the sea.

Dinan station has rail connections to Saint-Brieuc, Lamballe and Dol-de-Bretagne.

Population

Inhabitants of Dinan are called dinannais and dinannaises.

Attractions

 

The medieval town on the hilltop has many fine old buildings, some of which date from the 13th century. The town retains a large section of the city walls, part of which can be walked round.

Major historical attractions include the Jacobins Theatre dating from 1224, the flamboyant Gothic St Malo's Church, the Romanesque St Saviour's Basilica, Duchess Anne's Tower and the Château de Dinan.

A major highlight in the calendar is Dinan's Fête des Remparts. The town is transformed with decoration and many locals dress up in medieval garb for this two-day festival. The festival takes place over the third weekend in July every even-numbered year.

Breton language
In 2008, 4.97% of primary school children attended bilingual schools.

Personalities
Prominent people born in Dinan include:
 Charles Beslay (1795–1878), member of the Council of the Paris Commune
 Théodore Botrel (1868–1925), poet and singer
 Maurice Colbourne (1939–1989), actor
 Yves Guyot (1843–1928), politician and economist
 Auguste Pavie (1847–1925), explorer and diplomat
 Charles Pinot Duclos (1704–1772), author
 Pierre de Porcaro (1904–1945), Catholic priest and prisoner-of-war
 Jean Rochefort (1930–2017 ), actor
 Da Silva (singer) (1976–), singer
Yann Benoist, musician, (1951–)

Other people associated with Dinan include:
 François-René de Chateaubriand (1768–1848), writer, studied in Dinan
 Bertrand du Guesclin (c1320-80), connétable of France. Born at nearby Broons. His heart is buried in Dinan.
 John Everett Millais (1829–96), British painter who lived in Dinan as a child
 Danielle Mitterrand (1924–2011), wife of President François Mitterrand, educated at the Roger Vercel college
 Colonel Robert Jambon (1924/5-2011), soldier in the First Indochina War, died in Dinan
 Jean-François Paillard (1928– ), conductor, educated at the Cordeliers de Dinan
 Henri Pinault (1904–1987), Catholic Bishop of Chengdu, educated at the Cordeliers de Dinan
 René Pleven, (1901–1993), politician, minister, essayist. The hospital in Dinan is named after him.
 Horace Tuck (1876–1951), English painter, visited Dinan for its picturesque vistas
 Roger Vercel (1894–1957), writer, winner of the Prix Goncourt in 1934, died in Dinan. A college in the town is named after him.
 Edward Matthew Ward (1816–1879), English artist who painted views of Dinan

Gallery

International relations

Dinan is twinned with:

 Dinant, Belgium
 Exmouth, United Kingdom
 Lugo, Spain

See also
 Communes of the Côtes-d'Armor department

References

External links

  Town council website
 Dinan Basilica Image
 

 
Communes of Côtes-d'Armor
Subprefectures in France
Fortified settlements
Côtes-d'Armor communes articles needing translation from French Wikipedia